Japara Healthcare is an Australian company that operated aged care homes in  Australia. It was listed on the Australian Securities Exchange until November 2021 when it was acquired by Calvary Care. It runs 51 homes across Australia.

It acquired the Riviera Health residential aged care portfolio - four aged care facilities at Brighton-Le-Sands, New South Wales, Chatswood, Doonside and Wyong and a closed aged care facility in Toukley in March 2018.

There were complaints about staffing levels at its Albury facility in 2018.

The company introduced a new policy, called "Respecting Night Time for Residents - Etiquette Guidelines" in 2018 so staff no longer look in on residents overnight. The company says  this is "a very positive initiative as part of our dementia strategy," and is "based on clinical best practice and have been developed in response to resident and family feedback".  The Australian Nursing and Midwifery Federation say it is "obviously just a mechanism to cope with a reduction in staff".

The company lost about a sixth of its value in September 2018 when the government announced a public inquiry into misconduct in the aged care sector  and the Australian Broadcasting Corporation produced a two-part documentary focusing on alleged neglect and abuse of older people.

References 

Companies formerly listed on the Australian Securities Exchange
Aged care in Australia
Health care companies of Australia